Tangutur is a village near Proddatur and Ongole in India.

References

Villages in Kadapa district